Omar Khaled Dweik is a Jordanian footballer of Palestinian origin.

References

 

Living people
Jordanian footballers
Jordan youth international footballers
Association football midfielders
1994 births
Jordanian expatriate footballers
Jordanian expatriate sportspeople in Belgium
Expatriate footballers in Belgium
Al-Jazeera (Jordan) players
K.R.C. Genk players
UC Irvine Anteaters men's soccer players